Sudan competed at the 1996 Summer Olympics in Atlanta, United States.

Athletics

Men
Track & road events

Table Tennis

Men's Singles Tournament

Group A

References
Official Olympic Reports
sports-reference

Nations at the 1996 Summer Olympics
1996
Oly